Émile Joseph Isidore Gobert (1838–1922) was a French entomologist who specialised in Coleoptera then Diptera. He wrote Catalogue raisonné des insectes Coléoptères des Landes (1873-1880) and Catalogue des diptères de France (1887).

French entomologists
Dipterists
1838 births
1922 deaths